The Russian community in Greece are ethnic Russians living in Greece, and not the Greeks in Russia who immigrated to Greece in the 1990s.

There are 13,635 people of Russian origin living in Greece. Mostly in Athens, Thessaloniki and Crete. A small part came in the 1920s after the Russian Civil War, however the majority emigrated in the 1990s.

See also

 Russians
 Russian diaspora
 Greece–Russia relations
 Demographics of Greece

External links
Center of Russian Science and Culture in Athens (in Greek and Russian only)

Ethnic groups in Greece
Greece
 
 
Greece–Russia relations